This is a list of newspapers in Costa Rica.

Newspapers
 The Costa Rica News, daily, in English
 Diario Extra, daily, in Spanish; tabloid press; the country's principal newspaper by circulation
 La Nación, daily, in Spanish
 La Prensa Libre, daily, in Spanish; first newspaper founded in the country
 La Teja, daily, in Spanish
 The Tico Times, weekly, in English

See also 
 Media of Costa Rica

References

Further reading

External links
qcostarica.com, daily news, in English
 
 

Costa Rica
Newspapers published in Costa Rica
Magazines published in Costa Rica
Newspapers